"Them Heavy People" is a song written and recorded by Kate Bush, from her debut album The Kick Inside. It was issued as a single in Japan only with the title "Rolling the Ball" reaching number 3, its only release worldwide as an A-side.

The song is about religion, and the teachings of Jesus and Gurdjieff, among others. The song expresses an insistent desire to learn as much as possible, while she is still young.

A Seiko logo appears on the insert's back side, which makes it Bush's only commercial release featuring any kind of product endorsement. Bush also appeared in TV commercials and print ads for the brand in Japan.

A live recording of this song was the lead track on the On Stage EP which reached number 10 in the UK Singles Chart in 1979. In the Netherlands, the EP was listed as Them Heavy People in the Top 40 chart, making it basically an A-side. It peaked at number 17 in 1979.

Bush performed "Them Heavy People" on several TV programmes including her only appearance on Saturday Night Live in the US and the short-lived Revolver in Britain.

The song was parodied in a performance by Pamela Stephenson in an episode of Not the Nine O'Clock News in a version titled "Oh England – My Leotard".

Charts

References

Further reading
Them Heavy People, Kate's words about the song

External links
 

1978 singles
Kate Bush songs
Songs written by Kate Bush
1978 songs
EMI Records singles
Song recordings produced by Andrew Powell